FK BAK Bela Crkva is a Serbian football club based in Bela Crkva, Serbia.

History

Current team

BAK Bela Crkva
BAK Bela Crkva